LAP - Líneas Aéreas Paraguayas (also referred as LAP and later LAPSA Air Paraguay) was a Paraguayan airline that was founded in November 1962 to be the flag carrier airline of Paraguay. Its main hub was Silvio Pettirossi International Airport, in Asunción. The airline ceased operations in 1996 after being sold to TAM Linhas Aéreas.

History

Early operations

LAP was a creation of the Paraguayan Military Aviation on November 17, 1962. It was officially founded by the government through the Decree Nr.337 of March 18, 1963. It began services on August 20, 1963, using three Convair CV-240. Services included flights to Rio de Janeiro, Buenos Aires, Montevideo, Sao Paulo and Curitiba from the Paraguayan capital of Asuncion.

The CV-240s were replaced by three Lockheed L-188C Electra turboprops, which were acquired from Eastern Air Lines in 1969, and were operated for over 20 years. On February 26, 1969, the airline entered into regular operation, with three weekly frequencies for Sao Paulo. Once a week, the flight continued to Rio de Janeiro, before returning to Asunción. In 1970, service started to Santa Cruz de la Sierra, Resistencia and Salta with a Douglas C-47 transferred from the Military Air Transport of the FAP. In 1972, La Paz, Bolivia was added to LAP's network. In 1973 a route to Lima was inaugurated and in 1978 to Santiago.

Jet operations

The good service offered by the Lockheed Electras made LAP have a presence in Latin America. By March 1977, the number of weekly frequencies for Brazil had already increased. The pure jet age came in 1978 with the purchase of two Boeing 707-320 from Pan Am and with those services to Miami began. In 1979, services started to Madrid and Frankfurt. When another 707 was bought in 1982, service to Brussels started. Due to noise restrictions, a former Air Canada DC-8-63  was bought in 1984 for the route to Miami. During the 1980s, other routes were tried like Mexico City and Panama City, but just for a few months. In 1988, a former Spantax DC-8-61 was bought. In 1990, it was replaced by a leased DC-8-62 for a few months.

On February 2, 1989, General Andrés Rodríguez of the Paraguayan Army carried out a coup d'état, putting an end to the dictatorial government of General Alfredo Stroessner. A short time later, the changes that took place in the country would reach LAP. Audits carried out revealed that there were other officials and the quality of LAP's services was deteriorating. The president would order in 1989 that the airline be maintained using its own income. In 1990, LAP received a former United Airlines DC-8-71, followed by another similar aircraft in 1991.

In 1992, a McDonnell Douglas DC-10-30 came into service. Eventually LAP received two more DC-10s, one former Air France for a few months and a former Varig. Operations to US and Europe were performed by the DC-10s and regional flights with a 707 and the DC-8. In 1993, and for a few months, a BAe 146-300 was leased and operated on loan from the factory. Since LAP was a government losing company, attempts to privatize were not fruitful and the money losing operation was shut down on March 8, 1994.

Restart and end

In October of 1994, LAP was privatized and sold to Ecuatorian airline SAETA, along with an Ecuadorian-Paraguayan Consortium, which restarted operations on February 7, 1995 under the new name, LAPSA Air Paraguay with two Boeing 737-200, three Airbus A320-200, and one Airbus A310-300, all operated by SAETA. 

On September 1, 1996, Aerolíneas Paraguayas, a Paraguayan subsidiary of TAM Linhas Aéreas, purchased 80% of the majority shares of LAPSA, which by then both airlines were merged under the name TAM – Transportes Aéreos del Mercosur. It was then sold to TAM Linhas Aéreas later on October 6, which used two Fokker 100s to cover regional destinations. However, routes to Miami and Europe never restarted afterwards. In 2008, TAM Mercosur was renamed as TAM Paraguay, which continues to operate today under the LATAM brand.

Relaunch attempts
On August 3, 2020, the director of the Dirección Nacional de Aeronáutica Civil, Félix Kanazawa, announced that the state had reacquired the company and consequently its routes in the Americas, the United States and Europe. Kanazawa also mentioned that a decision has not yet been made on whether the company will be 100% state-owned, but has announced that a possible reactivation of the defunct Paraguayan flag airline is being considered.

In November 2021, Nella Linhas Aéreas announced its strategy of expanding operations in several Latin American countries with the re-launch of LAP. The airline was expected to return to service in March 2022 under the name LAP by Nella, with two Boeing 737-800s. As of September of 2022, this has not happened yet.

Destinations

Buenos Aires (Ministro Pistarini International Airport)
Jujuy (Gobernador Horacio Guzmán International Airport)
Resistencia (Resistencia International Airport)
Salta (Martín Miguel de Güemes International Airport)

Brussels (Brussels Airport)

La Paz (El Alto International Airport)
Santa Cruz de la Sierra (Viru Viru International Airport)

Curitiba (Afonso Pena International Airport)
Rio de Janeiro (Rio de Janeiro/Galeão International Airport)
Recife (Recife/Guararapes–Gilberto Freyre International Airport)
São Paulo (São Paulo/Guarulhos International Airport)

Toronto (Toronto Pearson International Airport)

Iquique (Diego Aracena International Airport)
Santiago (Arturo Merino Benítez International Airport)

 Bogotá (El Dorado International Airport)

 Guayaquil (José Joaquín de Olmedo International Airport)

Frankfurt (Frankfurt Airport)

Mexico City (Mexico City International Airport)

Amsterdam (Amsterdam Airport Schiphol)

Panama City (Tocumen International Airport)

Asunción (Silvio Pettirossi International Airport) Hub

Lima (Jorge Chávez International Airport)

Madrid (Madrid-Barajas International Airport)
Tenerife (Tenerife South Airport)

Miami (Miami International Airport)
New York City (John F. Kennedy International Airport)

Montevideo (Carrasco International Airport)

Fleet

LAP used throughout the years the following aircraft:

Accidents and incidents
On May 26, 1967, a Convair CV-240 (registered ZP-CDP) was approaching at runway 10 of the Ministro Pistarini International Airport. The aircraft suddenly nosed down and crashed its left wing and broke off, the aircraft skidded onto the runway and came to rest upside down. All 24 occupants onboard survived.
On May 8, 1969, a Convair CV-240 (registered ZP-CDN) was destroyed on a collision after a Pilatus PC-6 Porter (registered N356F) was doing a demonstration flight with one pilot on board and three passengers, two of them were high-ranking military officials. Everyone on board the PC-6 were killed, while no one was on board the CV-240.

See also
List of defunct airlines of Paraguay
LATAM Paraguay

References

Citations

Bibliography
Eastwood, Tony and Roach, John, Turbo Prop Airliner Production List, 1998, The Aviation Hobby Shop, .
"La Historia de Líneas Aéreas Paraguayas" by Antonio Luis Sapienza Fracchia. Author's edition. Asunción. 2004

External links

Information

Defunct airlines of Paraguay
Airlines established in 1962
Airlines disestablished in 1996